The 1962–63 season was East Stirlingshire Football Club's eighth consecutive season in the Scottish Division Two, having been re-elected to Scottish Football League in 1955–56. The club also competed in the Scottish Cup, Scottish League Cup and the minor Stirlingshire Cup.

Fixtures and results

Scottish Second Division

League table

Results by round

Scottish Cup

Scottish League Cup

Group 5

Other

Stirlingshire Cup

See also
List of East Stirlingshire F.C. seasons

References

External links 
 East Stirlingshire FC official site

East Stirlingshire F.C. seasons
East Stirlingshire